In enzymology, a tRNA guanosine-2'-O-methyltransferase is an enzyme that catalyzes the chemical reaction

S-adenosyl-L-methionine + tRNA  S-adenosyl-L-homocysteine + tRNA containing 2'-O-methylguanosine

Thus, the two substrates of this enzyme are S-adenosyl methionine and tRNA, whereas its two products are S-adenosylhomocysteine and tRNA containing 2'-O-methylguanosine.

This enzyme belongs to the family of transferases, specifically those transferring one-carbon group methyltransferases.  The systematic name of this enzyme class is S-adenosyl-L-methionine:tRNA guanosine-2'-O-methyltransferase. Other names in common use include transfer ribonucleate guanosine 2'-methyltransferase, tRNA guanosine 2'-methyltransferase, tRNA (guanosine 2')-methyltransferase, tRNA (Gm18) 2'-O-methyltransferase, tRNA (Gm18) methyltransferase, tRNA (guanosine-2'-O-)-methyltransferase, and S-adenosyl-L-methionine:tRNA (guanosine-2'-O-)-methyltransferase.

Structural studies

References

 
 
 

EC 2.1.1
Enzymes of known structure